Yin Yuzhen is a Chinese woman known for her personal efforts to combat desertification over the course of 30 years.

Biography 
Surrounded by a desolate desert living in a mud cave, Yin Yuzhen took it herself to singlehandedly plant trees rehabilitating the desolate environment in the Uxin Banner of China’s Semi-Arid Western landscape. As an expert by no means coming from humble beginnings, she initially began her botany excursion as experimentation with various vegetation in her backyard in 1985 attempting to grow the various vegetation from the dry mineral lacking sand. The landscape was barren and desolate which led her to want to make something more out of this seemingly inhabitable land. Producing food for her family, she looked to fight the soil erosion present in her backyard, which quickly transformed into something entirely new. She began to plant trees and quickly learned how difficult it was during the process of trial-and-error. In time Yin found success and attracted the eye of neighbors around her, who quickly looked to her to rehabilitate their family plots in the effort of reforestation. As the years went on, she continued to plant her trees, deciding she would rather have her back broken than be bullied into submission by the sandy desert that had plagued her life for too long. In 2005, her efforts were recognized when a local party secretary discovered her vegetation in the otherwise barren desert and was labeled a model worker, also known as a laomo. As a result of this, the state quickly lent her support by paving roads, installing power grids, and supplying her with saplings that grew her project from her backyard to spanning fifteen miles. Expanding the operation that was originally just her and her husband she now had an army to wage war on the oppressive environment that she had enough of.

Early life 
Yin Yuzhen, was born in Jingbian County, Shaanxi Province, in a small village. Housework was no stranger to her as her being the fifth of the seven siblings she had helping out and doing her part came to her by nature. Growing up poor she explained how she did not have luxury items such as rings, necklaces, or earrings that having those would make no sense as her family could barely afford the clothes on her back let alone food to get by. Not attending school at nineteen, her parents wished for her to be married, and she was arranged to be to Bai Wanxiang living in the Mu Us Desert in extreme conditions. Starting life in a desert but Yin, living in a cave, the ground she lived on the floor was covered with firewood and dry deadwood. The roof of the house was constructed out of an assortment of wood tied together with bits and pieces of rope and straw. She recalled the first time she set eyes on the house she wept for seven days and consumed only water in those seven days. The use of her living quarters requiring her to bend down to get inside her home and curl up into a ball to sleep. She stated in the first forty days of living there she did not see another human being and the first time she did she was so deprived of other human interaction that she ran to the man she say ultimately scaring him off. She often would have thoughts of suicide but stated that she simply did not have the ability to do it. She did not have a belt to hang herself and that there wasn’t a tree in sight for miles. This can be attributed to the desolate environment of the Mu Us Desert, spanning 16,300 miles, which is described as a sterile environment with one wind per year traveling from the spring till winter. These winds made it difficult for outsiders to enter the village, which let Yin essentially cut off from the rest of the country. She at times contemplated leaving the village, and when consulting her husband on the matter, he proclaimed that he would not survive in the desert alone and begged her to stay with him. She ultimately decided to stay fueled by her hard-working attitude and frustration from living in these conditions, Yin came to a critical decision that would change her life forever. She would rather wear herself down by planting trees to combat the desert than being beaten by the environment. She would not resort to begging, rather she would combat the desert and subdue it. As she worked to fight the desert she created a song that she would sing to herself to keep her going through the troubling times.

Desert Hymn

The sandstorm in the Maowusa Desert is filling the skies

I wish for green trees in the desert to keep me company

I kept a tree alive and it started to spread

I wish that the lands would be fertile and abundant

Planter of trees 

Yin quickly set out on her quest to change the environment she was living in for the better and selling her family’s livestock in exchange for 600 saplings planting the first ones in front of her home. She became adamant about changing the desert she inhabited into a lush forest teeming with life. Her husband joining her neither knew much about forestation nor planting trees went through significant trial and error. The harsh desert climate combated the initial saplings through powerful winds and significant drought. Out of the 600 saplings planted, only twelve survived. Determined not to die in a desolate desert Yin pressed on using the surviving twelve to propel her journey forward. To purchase more saplings, the two worked building houses and doing farm work in exchange for saplings. For thirty years Yin learned, how to change a barren desert into a lush forest teeming with life that had not lived in the land in decades. She treated the animals that came as if they were her children inhabiting the prior void of life desert, that seemed to be turning a new page. Discovering that water sources in the desert were exceedingly deep (390 feet), predicting the weather became increasingly important based on the last snowfall. Several saplings were prepared in advance to anticipate the number of trees needed to be planted in that limited window to give them the best possible chance for survival.

Initially planting trees such as willows and poplars, Yin discovered that the lifespan of said trees only lasted several decades and found an alternative in pine trees that can last several thousands of years. As a result of her actions in 2005, Yin was recognized as an ideal worker in China that safeguards the environment and quickly gained government support. With the government supporting her and its agenda, the afforestation effort exploded eventually. Yin stated that before the media discovered her she had nothing and then suddenly when she was discovered she was flooded by all this support and funds that uplifted herself from this hobbled state of living into a national icon. Yin was nominated for a Nobel Peace Prize from the Chinese Government. Funding these efforts, the Chinese Government quickly realized that this desert could be tamed by the efforts of those such as Yin and promptly looked to achieve their goals there with the creation of a monocultural forest.

Concerns for trees 

Yin has expressed her concerns for the forest, including the relative lack of ecological balance resulting from the mass planting of trees. Previously poplar trees were planted in mass amounts, quickly growing and thriving on deep groundwater. This deep use of groundwater results in desertification in the environment involved which is a bit of a backtrack as the whole premise of planting the trees was in an attempt to fight back against the desert when in turn it is creating another one as a result of monoculture forests  The rapid target driven forestation tactics such as the ones fueled by the state and not through courteous hard work that workers such as Yin have done in the past can destroy the very ecosystems that they are trying to save. Efforts such as these in the name of ecological salvation can do more harm than good such as green-grabbing in the name of tree conservation and planting that can uproot individuals that are living in the environment that is targeted. She has noted that her trees are deprived of topsoil and do require constant watering for the moment as a result of this. With her experience with trial and error for an ecosystem to be self-sufficient, a diversification of various factors such as animal and fungal species and trees exist alongside each other. These poplar trees can be quite profitable as the cutting and selling of these quick-growing trees make up 57.9% of the Uxin Banner in 2019

Today 
As a result of her overall success, Yin has gained significant government support and has been able to plant not just pine trees but watermelons, pear trees, peach trees, apricot trees, and other different variations of wildlife to boot. Her once backyard experiment has now been built into an ecological park that is bursting with life. Its production can generate considerable revenue for Yin and her family. Her environment is only in constant expansion due to outside investment attempting to meet China’s afforestation efforts. Her old life and clothes she has left in the past and has retired that simplistic squabble living. Yin states that she cares about what people think of her now since coming into the spotlight she feels as though she has to be constantly viewed as a model worker and the Chinese government has established that mantel on her. In the clothes that she was gifted by the media, her favorite green coat is ultimately her favorite, wearing her clothing with high spirit a reminder of all she has overcome in her life. The trees give her strength stating that she feels like a warrior emerging from gunfire when is surrounded by them a testament to what she has become. They have become more than lowly plant-life to her much like the animals that inhabit the trees around her she views the trees themselves as her children She has left her old hobbit dwelling behind for a modern house and has four children and six grandchildren among them. Even in her later years, Yin is still constantly looking to grow her in many aspects of her life quite literally as she now has an ecological friendly restaurant, office building, and a patriotism education base in her vicinity. She has inspired others in her village to fight back against the sand and have similar planting trees to control the sand. Her once-barren farm is now an ecological tourism center bringing on all different walks of life to come and observe her perseverance. In 1978 China launched Anti-desertification efforts in an attempt to combat desert areas of Northern China. Data according to the State Forestry Administration shows that the forest stratification has grown from 5.05% in 1977 to 12.4 in 2012  Many have attributed feats like this to Yin Yuzhen who one would think would at this point halt her expansion of greenery, but no she rather looks to expand her legacy onward and hopes to draw out economic opportunities from this once desolate land by harvesting mass amounts of economic crops.

Awards and recognition 

Yin’s afforestation efforts have been recognized by individuals such as Chinese Communist Party general secretary Xi Jinping, who, during the 2020 National People's Congress, described the actions of those such as Yin as a remarkable achievement and an overall improvement of the ecology in China. As well as being nominated for a Nobel Peace Prize by the Chinese Government Yin has been recognized by a number of different groups as well. The recipient of over sixty awards on the Chinese mainland as well as abroad. In 2013 she was awarded the Somazzi Prize, awarded to those who exemplify efforts of astounding peace and achievement regarding human rights. Later in 2015 she was recognized by China and elected to be one of the Ten Persons of the Year to Devolution of Homeland China.

Li Yunsheng 

Much like Yu Yuzhen, Li Yunsheng has dedicated his life to nurturing and taking care of the various trees he has come to call his own. Residing in the Shanxi Province in Youyu county for seven decades Li and the people of Youyu have spent day after day conditioning their lives centered around the cause of afforestation. At 65 years old, Li Yunsheng found a calling in nature by planting hundreds of trees around Matou Mountain. Born at Matoushan Village in a harsh desert climate Li lived in an exposed barren land deprived of life and desolate in nature. The difficulty of the environment made it toilsome to cook and boil water forcing Li and his family to eat foods simple in nature that were flower-based and drink water that was left untreated.

Trials and tribulations 

Li had been discharged from the military after being stationed in the People’s Liberation Army in 1984 he soon found work elsewhere, becoming a driver, eventually being able to establish his own driving school. Living in the village Li found that the land was harsh and unforgiving. Living with his family his wife, and three children, they struggled to get by. In 2002 the Youyu Government took matters into their own hands and relocated 20 households in the Matoushan Village due to these remote, barren conditions. However, Li felt as though he could not part with the village. Rather than leaving and relocating himself and his family, he instead opted to stay and improve the overall atmosphere of the village. Much like the story of Yin Yizhen Li wouldn’t give up his passionate nature to transform the sandy mountain. However, Li had trouble finding support for his passion as family members and friends mocked him as he had spent all his money on shrubs and pines in order to fix the soil. Only years later after seeing the finished progress of all of the hard dedicated work he performed did the recognition of what he had done finally came to fruition.

Planting journey 

Much like Yu Yuzhen, Li took it upon himself to change the barren environment around him. Tree planting became his craft as he would travel up the mountain every day, packing a lunch and a cool drink to aid him on his journey. He was able to contract about 83 hectares of Matou Mountain and used the land acquired to spread his forest. As Li described, he had much trouble planting initially, much like the efforts the Chinese Government puts in its Great Green Wall initiatives with the Gobi Desert trees can combat the harsh conditions of the desert and without them, saplings will have difficulty surviving initially. The desert winds are fierce, and saplings with no support cover from other trees are often battered through sandstorms and the harsh winds that reside in deserts. Li had a solution for this, though as through trial and error his methods as he stated, "First I wrapped the roots of saplings with plastic bags, stabilized the roots with mud deep inside the sandy land. After two or three years, I dug the sand and moved away from the plastic bags. Through this way, the saplings could be rooted stably in sandy lands regardless of the wind." Planting trees upwards of five times repetitively for them to survive, Li was determined to change the surrounding landscape. He quickly soon found out that in order to plant the mountain he lacked the constant movement of supplies as there was no road and all of his supplies were forcing him to carry them on foot, a challenge that crippled his progress for a time. Something had to be done in order for his dream to become a reality,  he needed to have a road. If a road did not come the issue of watering the saplings as well as plant more would cause the progress Li had made to fall flat.

Botanical breakthrough 

After receding into debt as a result of his massive spending for his tree-planting passion, accumulating five million Yuan in debt ($726,000) A road proved to be his salvation as the Wang Jian of the transportation Bureau elected for the creation of a road which Li was able to use to pay back most of his debt through exporting cattle and facilitate the purchasing of more trees. The road made the Transportation of raw materials all the better. Li initially would spend upwards of 100,000-200,000 yuan each year to get his operation off the ground. In contrast, in more recent years, his forest has become so lush that he finds that he only needs to spend about 10,000 a year to replant old trees that have died and proper forest management. He attributes this massive spending to his love of trees, stating; “What I’m aiming for...I really don’t know the answer. I just simply love trees.”

Today 

Li has successfully brought the fruits of his labor to his home, despite the doubters who criticized him on his journey. As a result of his efforts, Youyu has been transformed into an extensive forest that has upwards of 130 million trees in its vicinity. Recently Li has taken up a breeding business that has allowed him to turn a profit on this land by earning upwards of 300,000-500,000 yuan of profit as well as his cattle business made possible by the road into town. The soil surrounding the county has become more fertile in nature as well as boosting the business dealings of Shanxi Youyu Tuyuan Industries. With the improvement of the environment, the company has been able to plant and harvest good quality scallions and even make a substantial profit from them, a feat that was frankly not possible years ago when Li first began his quest. Li, much like Yin can be considered a model citizen as with efforts such as his China may be able to accelerate its afforestation ideals continuously

Problems with large scale afforestation 

As the efforts of afforestation have been largely successful in the examples of Yin Yuzhen and Li Yunsheng. This largely can be attributed to the use of trial and error tactics when planting trees as well as the wide variety of vegetation that creates an ecological balance with the environment learning to exist among one another. Rather than focusing on preventing desertification by rapidly mass planting trees, recreating a natural ecological balance would be more beneficial to the environment it is subjected to. As stated by Shixiong Cao of China’s Agricultural University, “Planting trees in arid and semiarid regions of China has led to increased environmental degradation and impacts on soil moisture, hydrology, and vegetation coverage.” The large production of monocultural forests have led to the rapid desertification of areas that have been depleted of groundwater depriving the land of minerals and vegetation leading to a desolate environment. This can be partly attributed to programs in China such as the Three Norths Shelter Forest System Project in an attempt to tackle large-scale desertification and partake in the mass afforestation efforts that China so desperately needs. This effort will last until 2050 and has resulted in 29% of China being affected by afforestation efforts; however, as the land that has been impacted by the rapid movement of afforestation Equally, the erosion of land has increased exponentially. The efforts such as these are incredibly resource-dependent and require considerable amounts of funds to operate. This leads to the conclusion that along with the expansion of forestation, the scope of destruction is equally as impactful, implying that these heavy cost efforts are not very productive. Despite the efforts, the frequency and consistency of various sandstorms have increased and affected northern China’s desert region and other nations, including South Korea, Japan, and even North America. Another instance of the impact of rapid tree planting would be the impact in cases of drought. Often the soil in a region can withstand periods of drought due to the dampness of the soil being able to carry over to the next rainfall. However, as a result of these deep water-dependent trees needing constant water supplies, the natural deep groundwater wells are depleted, increasing tree mortality and leading to rapid desertification. The efforts of reforestation have been successful to a degree, yet according to Shixiong Cao of China’s Agricultural University “Since 1949, the overall survival rate of trees planted during afforestation projects has been only 15% across arid and semiarid northern China.”

Ties to ecological civilization 

Instances such as the experiences of Yu Yuzhen and Li Yunsheng have demonstrated China’s idea of ecological civilization. Initially, the Chinese state has expanded its nation through rapid economic expansionary tactics, and when confronted with a crossroads between economic expansion and issues concerning the environment, the environment was left out to dry previously. However, in more recent years China has concerned itself with combating climate change and making a name for itself as the leading superpower in clean alternative energy. Efforts like this can be attributed to China’s commitment to the Paris Climate Accords and the efforts of those such as Yin and Li have only fueled their commitment to changing their face as the worlds leading emitter of carbon emissions. China has made a significant effort in combating its environmental impact more recently with a heightened focus on air quality that has been steadily improving over the years. This rapid afforestation is extremely beneficial to the air quality in China as these barren wastelands have been transformed from seemingly useless deserts into oxygen-producing epicenters that in turn can lower the carbon impact from China multiple times over.

Air quality contribution 

The Air Quality in China has been deteriorating rapidly over the course of the last several decades. With the transformation of China into a rapidly developing consumer culture society after the death of Mao Zedong and the emergence of Deng Xiaoping the nation transformed into a society surrounded by capitalistic ideas yet straining the control of a Communist State with neoliberal principles  As a result of this China has created an export-driven economy that facilitates its economic expansion through outside corporations taking advantage of China’s lax workers’ protections that allow them cheap cost in manufacturing while maximizing their profits abroad. As a result of this factories in multiple cities in China have led its emission to rise through its use of coal power where 65% of China’s power came from coal alone. The emissions coal contributes about 72% of electrical emissions yearly. Air pollution has been seen to have great impacts on the health and wellbeing of those who inhale it. In a study by The American Journal of Epidemiology on The China Air Pollution and Health Effects Study high levels of air pollution were seen to have adverse effects on the cardiopulmonary health of those subjected to. This only stresses the need for more afforestation efforts in China as it looks to expand its coal-powered plants as well as exporting the power to other developing countries through programs such as the Belt and Road Initiative. In a larger sense the efforts of those such as Yin Yuzhen as well as Li Yunsheng.

References

External links 

 , short portrait of her life

People from Jingbian County
Desertification
Chinese environmentalists
1960s births
Living people
Year of birth uncertain